Callulops dubius is a species of frog in the family Microhylidae.
It is endemic to Indonesia.
Its natural habitat is subtropical or tropical moist lowland forests.

References

Sources

Callulops
Taxonomy articles created by Polbot
Amphibians described in 1895